Caspar Bartholin (also Berthelsen or Bartholinus) may refer to:

 Caspar Bartholin the Elder (1585–1629), Danish theologian and medical professor
 Caspar Bartholin the Younger (1655–1738), Danish anatomist